Aliir Mayom Aliir (born 5 September 1994) is a professional Australian rules footballer playing for the Port Adelaide Football Club in the Australian Football League (AFL). He formerly played for the Sydney Swans.

Early life and career
Born in the Kakuma refugee camp in Kenya to South Sudanese parents, Aliir's family moved to Australia when he was eight years old, eventually settling in Brisbane. After learning to kick a football at Kedron State High School, he was invited by a friend to play Australian rules football for the Aspley Hornets as a 14-year-old. Within a few years, he had made the Queensland side and was invited to play for the world XVIII at the under-16 championships in Sydney. It was during this trip that Aliir discovered he had a long-lost sister trying to contact him.

In 2012, Aliir's mother, brothers and sisters moved to Perth to reunite with extended family. Aliir decided to remain in Brisbane, and that year, he made his debut in the NEAFL for Aspley. Aliir made his mark as a ruckman in 2012 while playing for the Hornets and the Queensland Under-18 Scorpions.

After being overlooked in the 2012 AFL draft, Aliir made the decision to relocate to Perth to live with his family. There he joined the East Fremantle Football Club and spent the 2013 season playing for the club's Colts team. With East Fremantle, he was converted from a ruckman to a defender.

AFL career
Aliir was drafted by the Sydney Swans at pick 44 in the 2013 AFL draft, becoming the first player of Sudanese heritage taken in the National Draft. Aliir had a promising debut season with the Swans reserves in the NEAFL. He suffered a dislocated shoulder mid-season, and was ruled out for the remainder of the year in round 16, which resulted in him missing the team's 2014 NEAFL finals campaign.

After a slow start, 2015 was another solid year of development in the NEAFL for Aliir, playing mainly as a key defender. Aliir played 16 games and averaged 16 possessions at more than 80 per cent efficiency and took the most marks (86) for the Swans reserves. Heading into the 2016 AFL season, Aliir was in line to take over from Ted Richards in Sydney's defence.

Aliir made his long-awaited AFL debut against the Brisbane Lions at the Gabba in Round 6, 2016. He quickly cemented his place in the team after round 16, as he played in every match between then and the Swans' preliminary final match. However, in the preliminary final, Aliir suffered a low-grade medial strain late in the first quarter of their win over Geelong. The injury consequently ruled him out of the Grand Final. The Swans went on to lose the Grand Final by 22 points to the Western Bulldogs.

Statistics
 Statistics are correct to the end of round 22, 2022

|- style="background:#eaeaea;"
! scope="row" style="text-align:center" | 2016
|style="text-align:center;"|
| 36 || 13 || 0 || 0 || 103 || 84 || 187 || 56 || 31 || 0.0 || 0.0 || 7.9 || 6.5 || 14.4 || 4.3 || 2.4 || 0
|-
! scope="row" style="text-align:center" | 2017
|style="text-align:center;"|
| 36 || 3 || 0 || 0 || 20 || 15 || 35 || 11 || 9 || 0.0 || 0.0 || 6.7 || 5.0 || 11.7 || 3.7 || 3.0 || 0
|- style="background:#eaeaea;"
! scope="row" style="text-align:center" | 2018
|style="text-align:center;"|
| 36 || 12 || 1 || 1 || 121 || 74 || 195 || 91 || 13 || 0.1 || 0.1 || 10.1 || 6.2 || 16.3 || 7.6 || 1.1 || 3
|-
! scope="row" style="text-align:center" | 2019
|style="text-align:center;"|
| 36 || 22 || 1 || 0 || 222 || 124 || 346 || 104 || 44 || 0.1 || 0.0 || 10.1 || 5.6 || 15.7 || 4.7 || 2.0 || 0
|- style="background:#eaeaea;"
! scope="row" style="text-align:center" | 2020
|
| 36 || 14 || 3 || 1 || 78 || 57 || 135 || 45 || 22 || 0.2 || 0.1 || 5.6 || 4.1 || 9.6 || 3.2 || 1.6 || 0
|-
! scope="row" style="text-align:center" | 2021
|style="text-align:center;"|
| 21 || 24 || 0 || 1 || 268	|| 100 || 386 || 156 || 37 || 0.0 || 0.0 || 11.2 || 4.2 || 15.3 || 6.5 || 1.5 || 7
|- style="background:#eaeaea;"
! scope="row" style="text-align:center" | 2022
|style="text-align:center;"|
| 21 || 18 || 0 || 1 || 172	|| 70 || 242 || 85 || 30 || 0.0 || 0.0 || 9.6 || 3.9 || 13.4 || 4.7 || 1.7 ||
|- class="sortbottom"
! colspan=3| Career
! 106
! 5
! 4
! 984
! 524
! 1508
! 548
! 186
! 0.1
! 0.0
! 9.3
! 4.9
! 14.2
! 5.2
! 1.8
! 10
|}

Notes

Personal
Aliir is the cousin of Matur Maker who plays for the Rio Grande Valley Vipers of the NBA G League and Thon Maker, who last played for the Cleveland Cavaliers of the NBA.

References

External links

1994 births
Living people
VFL/AFL players born outside Australia
Aspley Football Club players
Australian people of South Sudanese descent
Sportspeople of South Sudanese descent
Australian rules footballers from Queensland
East Fremantle Football Club players
Kenyan emigrants to Australia
South Sudanese refugees
Sydney Swans players
Port Adelaide Football Club players
Dinka people
South Sudanese players of Australian rules football
Sportspeople from Brisbane
Refugees in Kenya